Anna Kawamura (born 26 October 1991) is a Japanese handball player for Sony Semiconductor and the Japanese Republic national team.

References

1991 births
Living people
Japanese female handball players